Hopfner (alternatively spelled Höpfner or Hoepfner) may refer to:

People
Elyse Hopfner-Hibbs ( Elyse Null; born 1989), Canadian gymnast and YouTube personality
Ernst Höpfner (1836–1915), German educator, philologist, and journal founder
Friedrich Hopfner (1881–1949), Austrian geodesist, geophysicist, and planetary scientist
Heiner Hopfner (1941–2014), German operatic singer and singing teacher
Hermann Höpfner (born 1945), German gymnast and Olympics competitor
Karl Hopfner (born 1952), German football executive
Matthias Höpfner (born 1975), German bobsledder and Olympics competitor
Michael Hopfner (1947–2009), Canadian hotel owner, electrical contractor, politician, and fraudster
Oswald Hoepfner (1872–1957), American sculptor
Richard Hoepfner (born 1944), American sailor and Olympic medalist
Ute Höpfner (born 1976), German sailor and Olympics competitor
Wolfram Hoepfner (born 1937), German classicist, archaeologist, architectural historian, and professor

Aircraft
Hopfner (aircraft manufacturer), Austrian aircraft manufacturer
Hopfner HA-11/33
Hopfner HS-5/28
Hopfner HS-8/29
Hopfner HS-9/32 ( Hirtenberg HS.9)
Hopfner HS-10/32
Hopfner HV-3/27
Hopfner HV-4/28
Hopfner HV 15 ( Hirtenberg HV.15)
Hopfner HV-6/28

See also
Hopfer (disambiguation), a similarly spelled surname

German-language surnames